Craig Hill (born Craighill Fowler; March 5, 1926 – April 21, 2014) was an American film actor from Los Angeles, California.

Career
He began his film career as a contract star for 20th Century Fox beginning with Cheaper by the Dozen.  He also appeared in Sam Fuller's Fixed Bayonets (1951) and John Ford's What Price Glory as well as in a key role opposite Kirk Douglas in the 1951 crime drama Detective Story. After leaving Fox, he co-starred in Universal's The Black Shield of Falworth (1954) and appeared in several American television shows.

He is best known for co-starring in the Desilu Studios television series Whirlybirds from 1957 to 1960, playing "P.T. Moore". In the mid-1960s, he moved to Spain and gained a new series of fans as a lead actor in several Spaghetti Westerns beginning with Hands of a Gunfighter (1965). He starred in several Euro Horror films as well, including The Bloodstained Shadow (1978) and The Monsters of Terror (1970).

Personal life/death
Actor Ray Stricklyn says that he met Hill about Christmas 1955, and the two spent a year together in a homosexual relationship. Sticklyn says he broke up with Hill after he discovered Hill was seeing another man.

In 1990, Hill wed Catalan fashion model and actress Teresa Gimpera (born 1936), his co-star in the 1966 Spanish film Black Box Affair. Hill died on April 21, 2014, at the age of 88 from natural causes in Barcelona, Spain.

Filmography

References

External links

 

1926 births
2014 deaths
American male film actors
Male actors from Los Angeles
American expatriates in Spain
Male Spaghetti Western actors